Carmen Guzman (born July 16, 1985) is a Dominican – American female professional basketball player.

External links
Profile at eurobasket.com

1985 births
Living people
Sportspeople from New York (state)
Dominican Republic women's basketball players
American women's basketball players
Point guards
Centers (basketball)
21st-century American women